Middle LaHave is a small village in Nova Scotia, Canada. The community is located in the Lunenburg Municipal District in Lunenburg County.

Middle LaHave features the narrowest and widest parts of the LaHave River. Which, in the past, made Middle LaHave a major community along the river. The community draws electricity from both the Riverport Electric Light Commission as well as NS Power and also shares both Riverport and Bridgewater telephone exchanges. It has a diverse terrain from low-lying areas to the rolling hills of the Bear Hills area. There are two churches serving the community, being Anglican and United. The third church was closed in 2005, later sold and renovated and officially reopened in 2011 as St. Mark's Place, a privately owned entertainment facility available for community use.

History

Samuel de Champlain struck settlement claims along the banks of both the North and South shores of the river, including Middle LaHave. Traditionally the Northern side of the LaHave is predominantly on the Lighthouse Route, offering a diverse culture, with both French and English backgrounds. Following the colonization by British and French settlers, German families also immigrated to the South Shore, founding Lunenburg in 1753.

Culture
Their culture and traditions are apparent in the area from the dialect to the architecture. Middle LaHave has a wide variety of inhabitants, including traditional and local families such as Crouse, Corkum, Schmeisser, Lohnes and Mosher. The culture of the LaHave and its founding fathers continues to spread throughout Nova Scotia.

External links
Municipality of the District of Lunenburg

Communities in Lunenburg County, Nova Scotia
General Service Areas in Nova Scotia